The 1969–70 Duquesne Dukes men's basketball team represented Duquesne University in 1969–70 NCAA University Division men's basketball season.

Schedule

|-
!colspan=9 style=| NIT

Team players drafted into the NBA

References 

Duquesne
Duquesne
1969 in sports in Pennsylvania
1970 in sports in Pennsylvania
Duquesne Dukes men's basketball seasons